31192 Aigoual, provisional designation , is a Xizang asteroid from the central region of the asteroid belt, approximately 7 kilometers in diameter. It was discovered on 29 December 1997, by staff members of the Pises Observatory in southern France. The asteroid was named after Mont Aigoual in France.

Orbit and classification 

Aigoual is a member of the small Xizang family, named after 2344 Xizang. It orbits the Sun in the central main-belt at a distance of 2.2–3.3 AU once every 4 years and 7 months (1,670 days). Its orbit has an eccentricity of 0.19 and an inclination of 3° with respect to the ecliptic.

Physical characteristics 

Aigoual is an assumed carbonaceous C-type asteroid, while the overall spectral type of the Xizang family has not yet been evaluated.

Rotational lightcurve 

In October 2010, a rotational lightcurve of Aigoual was obtained from photometric observations made by astronomers at the Palomar Transient Factory in California. Lightcurve analysis gave a rotation period of  hours with a brightness amplitude of 0.56 magnitude.

Diameter and albedo estimate 

The Collaborative Asteroid Lightcurve Link assumes a standard albedo for a carbonaceous asteroid of 0.057 and calculates a diameter of 7.3 kilometers with an absolute magnitude of 14.4.

Naming 

This minor planet was named after Mont Aigoual, in the Cévennes National Park, where the discovering observatory is located. It is the highest mountain of the Cévennes in the Massif Central, France. The approved naming citation was published by the Minor Planet Center on 28 March 2002.

References

External links 
 Asteroid Lightcurve Database (LCDB), query form (info )
 Dictionary of Minor Planet Names, Google books
 Asteroids and comets rotation curves, CdR – Observatoire de Genève, Raoul Behrend
 Discovery Circumstances: Numbered Minor Planets (35001)-(40000) – Minor Planet Center
 
 

031192
031192
Named minor planets
19971229